Anton Heiller (15 September 1923 – 25 March 1979) was an Austrian organist, harpsichordist, composer and conductor.

Biography
Born in Vienna, he was first trained in church music by Wilhelm Mück, organist of Vienna's Stephansdom (St. Stephen's Cathedral). He then combined work as répétiteur and choirmaster at the Vienna Volksoper with further study at the Vienna Academy of Music under Bruno Seidlhofer (piano, organ, harpsichord) and Friedrich Reidinger (music theory and composition) while serving in the military, mostly as a medical aide. In 1945, he both graduated from the Academy and was appointed organ teacher there. He was promoted to professor in 1957.

Heiller's career after World War II is an uninterrupted list of concerts, lectures, records, jury service at contests, and professional honors. In 1952 he won the International Organ Competition in Haarlem, Netherlands, and toured both Europe and the United States, where his organ recitals at Harvard University (on the then new C.B. Fisk instrument in Memorial Church) — still available on a 4-CD boxed set — were particularly appreciated. A few years before this, he had released a set of recordings for Vanguard of many of Bach's larger organ works on a majestic Marcussen instrument in Sweden. His two Haydn Society LPs, from the early 1950s, of Joseph Haydn's Symphonies 26 ("Lamentation") and 36 and Symphonies 52 and 56, are distinguished for their forthright conciseness and straightforwardness, without gratuitous ritardandi or other tempo changes not requested by Haydn in the score.

Successive Austrian governments bestowed on Heiller every artistic award in their power, including the Vienna Culture Prize (1963), the Vienna Cross of Honor for Arts and Science (1968) and the Grand Austrian State Prize (1969). Offered the conductorship of the Vienna State Opera he declined in order to concentrate on keyboard playing, although near the end of his life he said he was looking forward to conducting more.

Heiller recorded most of his large repertory, which ranged from Giovanni Gabrieli and Dieterich Buxtehude through Bach to Max Reger and Heiller's good friend Paul Hindemith. Romantic works interested him much less than Baroque and 20th-century material. In whatever works he performed he displayed formidable technique, immense rhythmic strength and, in particular, a rare talent for clarifying and maintaining the momentum of the most complex polyphonic passages with what sounded like effortless ease.

He also composed from his teens onward. His works, influenced by Hindemith and Frank Martin, were often dodecaphonic, and never achieved anything like the acclaim of his performances, but he was prolific and composed much music for his own instrument, including an organ concerto (1963) and what may be the only concerto ever written for organ and harpsichord (1972).

He died unexpectedly and prematurely in Vienna at the age of 55, collapsing after choking on food, from what was thought to be a heart attack.

His notable pupils include Monique Gendron, Wolfgang Karius, Jan Kleinbussink, Douglas Lawrence, Brett Leighton, Peter Planyavsky, Michael Radulescu, David Rumsey, David Sanger, Jean-Claude Zehnder, and Miriam Clapp Duncan .

Works
1937 – Drei frühe Choralvorspiele – für Orgel

1938 – Die Bäume blühn und duften – für gemischten Chor a cappella

1938 – Christus factus est – für gemischten Chor a cappella

1940 – Sonatensatz in D für Orgel

1940 – Passacaglia in C für Orgel

1941 – Zwischenspiel E-Dur für Orgel

1941 – Toccata für Klavier

1941 – Fantasie und Fuge in F für Orgel

1942 – Drei Lieder nach Gedichten von Anton Wildgans – für Mezzosopran und Klavier

1943 – Klavierstück

1943 – O du fröhliche – Choralvorspiel und Choral für Orgel

1943 – Toccata Zwei Klaviere zu vier Händen

1943 – Intermezzo – für Klavier

1944 – Ave Maria – für Sopran, Violine und Viola

1944 – Es ist ein Ros’ entsprungen (Kleine Partita für Orgel)

1944 – Messe in mixolydisch g – für gemischten Chor a cappella	

1944 – Sonate für Orgel

1945 – Wen Gott liebt – Spruch für Gesang und Klavier

1945 – Das Marienkind – Musik zum gleichnamigen Legendenspiel

1945 – Lux fulgebit nos – für vier Knabenstimmen

1945 – Der Heiland ist erstanden – Choralmotette für gemischten Chor a cappella

1946 –	Kammersinfonie

1946 – Requiem – für dreistimmigen gemischten Chor a cappella

1946 –	Laetentur caeli – für vierstimmigen Knabenchor

1946 – Christus factus est – für dreistimmigen Knabenchor

1947 – Ave Maria – für Sopran und Klavier oder Orgel

1947 – Resurrexi – für vierstimmigen gemischten Chor a cappella

1947 – Unam petii a domino – für Knabenchor a cappella

1947 – Exsurge, Domine – für Männerchor a cappella

1947 – Zweite Sonate für Orgel

1947 – Zwei kleine Partiten:

I)	“Freu dich sehr, o meine Seele”

II)	“Vater unser im Himmelreich”

1948 – Messe in lydisch f – für vierstimmigen gemischten Chor und Orgel

1948 – Missa in nocte – für zweistimmigen Oberchor und Orgel

1949 – Präludium und Fuge A-Dur – für Orgel

1949 – Dreifaltigkeitsproprium – für gemischten Chor a cappella

1949 – Ach wie nichtig, ach wie flüchtig – Choralmotette für gemischten Chor a cappella

1950 – Tragische Geschichte – für gemischten Chor a cappella

1951 – Nörgeln – für gemischten Chor a cappella

1951 – Hoc corpus – für gemischten Chor a cappella

1951 – O Jesu, all mein Leben – für gemischten Chor a cappella

1951 – Missa brevis in C – für gemischten Chor a cappella

1951 – Grad dort – für gemischten Chor a cappella

1951–1953 – Drei kleine geistliche Chöre – für gemischten Chor a cappella

1952 – Tentatio Jesu – Kurzoratorium für Soli, gemischten Chor und zwei Klaviere

1953 – Ich liebe dich von Herzensgrund – für Oberchor a cappella

1953 – Missa super "Erhalt uns, Herr, bei deinem Wort" – für Frauen- oder Knabenchor a cappella

1953 – Te Deum für gemischten Chor und Orgel

1955 – So treiben wir den Winter aus – für gemischten Chor a cappella

1955 – Psalmenkantate – für Soli, gemischten Chor, Orgel und Orchester

1956 – Deutsches Proprium für den Dreifaltigkeitssonntag – für gemischten Chor a cappella

1956 – François Villon – Rundfunkballade (Oratorium) für Soli, Chor und Orchester

1956 – Memorare – für gemischten Chor a cappella

1957 – Ave Maria – für dreistimmigen Oberchor

1957 – Missa super "Salve regina" et "Vater unser im Himmelreich" – für dreistimmigen Oberchor

1957 – Vier österreichische Volksliedsätze – für Männerchor a cappella

1957 – Confirma hoc, Deus – für gemischten Chor a cappella

1958 – Regina martyrum – Kantate für Soli, vierstimmigen Chor und Orgel

1958 – Postludium super "Ite, missa est XI" (für Orgel)

1958 – Vier geistliche Motetten – (Proprium in Anniversario Dedicationis ecclesiae) für gemischten Chor a cappella

I)	Terribilis est

II)	Locus iste

III)	Domine deus

IV)	Domus mea

1959 – Domine Deus omnipotens – Hymnus für Sopran und Klavier

1959 – In festo corporis Christi (Vier Stücke zum Fronleichnamsfest)

1959 – Zwei geistliche Gesänge – für Sopran und Orgel

1960 – Lobet, ihr Knechte des Herrn – Kleine Motette für gemischten Chor a cappella

1960 – Tantum ergo I über ein Zwölftonmodell – für gemischten Chor a cappella

1960 – Tantum ergo II über die gregorianische Melodie – für gemischten Chor a cappella

1960 – Missa super modos duodecimales – für gemischten Chor und sieben Instrumente

1960 – O Rex gentium – für gemischten Chor a cappella

1961 – Klavierstück über den Namen "Alfred Schlee"

1961 – Stufen – für Oberchor a cappella

1961 – Pater noster, Ave Maria – für Alt und Klavier

1961 – Kleine Messe über Zwölftonmodelle – für gemischten Chor a cappella

1962 – Fiat voluntas tua – für Alt und Klavier

1963 – Der 37. Psalm – für Chor und Orchester

1963 – Konzert für Orgel und Orchester

1964 – Terribilis est – für gemischten Chor a cappella

1964 – Sub tuum praesidium – für Alt und Klavier

1964 – Proprium zum Fronleichnamsfest – für dreistimmigen gemischten Chor a cappella

1965 – Deutsches Ordinarium – für gemischten Chor und Orgel oder Orchester

1965 – English Mass – for mixed choir, congregation and organ

1965 – Fantasia super “Salve Regina” (für Orgel)

1965 – In principio erat verbum – Kantate für Tenor, gemischten Chor, Orchester und Orgel

1965 – Nun bitten wir den heiligen Geist – Kleines Choralvorspiel für Orgel

1966 – Deutsches Proprium für den vierten Sonntag nach Ostern – für Knaben- oder Frauenchor

1967 – Deutsches Proprium zum Dreifaltigkeitsfest – für Chor, Gemeinde und Orgel

1967 – Ecce lignum crucis – Meditation für Orgel

1968 – Das Laub fällt von den Bäumen – für gemischten Chor a cappella

1968 – Improvisation über den Gregorianischen Choral “Ave maris stella”

1968 – Stabat Mater für gemischten Chor und Orchester

1970 – Geistliches Konzert – für gemischten Chor und sechs Holzbläser

1970 – 100 Jahre Wiener Musikverein – Geburtstagsgabe in einer Reihe von 100 Tönen

1970 – Tanz-Toccata für Orgel

1971 – Adventmusik – für Oboe, Violine, Kinderchor und Orgel

1971–1972 – Konzert für Cembalo, Orgelpositiv & Kamerorchester

1972 – Nun komm’ der Heiden Heiland (Variationen für Orgel)

1973 – Solo – für Gitarre

1973 – Passionsmusik – für Kinderchor und Orgel

1974 – Drei Weihnachtslieder – für Oberchor a cappella

1974 – Meditation für Orgel über die Gregorianische Oster-Sequenz ("Victimae Paschali Laudes")

1974 – Nicht Knechte, sondern meine Freunde nenne ich euch – für gemischten Chor a cappella

1974 – Verleih uns Frieden gnädiglich – Choralvorspiel für Orgel

1975 – Drei kleine Choralvorspiele für Orgel:

I)	“Valet will ich dir geben”

II)	“Der Tag ist hin”

III)	“Mit Fried und Freud ich fahr dahin”

1975 – Aus tiefer Not schrei ich zu dir – Intonation, Choral und drei Variationen für Orgel

1975 – Ein wenig über B-A-C-H – Drei kleine Stücke für Cembalo

1975 – Kleine deutsche Messe – für Oberchor und Orgel

1976 – Jubilato (für Orgel)

1977 – Hymnus für Chor und Orgel aus der Vesper für Kantor, Soli, Chor und Orgel

1977 – Hochgebet mit eigenem Sanctus – für Singstimme allein

1977 – Magnificat aus der Vesper für Kantor, Soli, Chor und Orgel

1977 – Es ist ein Ros’ entsprungen (Orgelsatz)

1977 – Kleine Partita über das dänische Lied: “Den klare sol går ned” (für Orgel, mit Anhang für Flöte solo)

1977 – Vorspiel, Zwischenspiel und Nachspiel aus der “Vesper” für Kantor, Chor und Orgel

1977–1978 – Choralvorspiele zu Liedern des Dänischen Gasangbuchs:

I)	O Hoved, højt forhånet (O Haupt voll Blut und Wunden’)

II)	Det hellige kors

III)	Rind nu op i Jesu navn (Steh nun auf in Jesu Namen)

IV)	Min sjael, den Herren love (Nun lob mein Seel den Herren)

V)	Sorrig og glæde de vandre til hobe (Kummer und Freude, zusammen sie wandern)

VI)	Som lilliens hjerte kan holdes i grøde (Wie der Lilie Herze kann reifen zur Ernte)

VII)	Freu dich sehr, meine Seele

1978 – Kleine Partita “Erhalt uns, Herr, bei deinem Wort”

References

1923 births
1979 deaths
20th-century classical composers
20th-century classical musicians
Austrian classical organists
Male classical organists
Musicians from Vienna
Male classical composers
20th-century organists
20th-century male musicians